Richard Anthony Flavell (born 23 August 1945 in Chelmsford, Essex), PhD, FRS is an English molecular biologist, and Sterling Professor of Immunobiology, at Yale School of Medicine where he uses transgenic and gene-targeted mice to study Innate and Adaptive immunity, T cell tolerance and activation in immunity and autoimmunity, apoptosis, and regulation of T cell differentiation.
He is an investigator at the Howard Hughes Medical Institute. In 2013, Flavell received the Vilcek Prize in Biomedical Science. In July 2016, Flavell received an honorary doctorate degree from the University of Hull. He is an honorary member of the British Society for Immunology.

Life
He earned a Ph.D. from University of Hull in 1970.
He studied at the University of Amsterdam, and the University of Zurich, where he studied with Charles Weissmann. 
He taught at University of Amsterdam from 1974–1979, then headed the Laboratory of Gene Structure and Expression at the National Institute for Medical Research, Mill Hill, London from 1979–82. Following a move to Biogen in 1982, he became the President and Chief Scientific Officer of Biogen until 1988, when he moved to Yale.

References

External links
https://web.archive.org/web/20120528014801/http://info.med.yale.edu/ysm/medicineatyale/v4i4_sept_oct_2008/lifelines.html
http://www.cell.com/abstract/S0092-8674(11)00480-6
http://www.ars.usda.gov/News/docs.htm?docid=16851

1945 births
Living people
Alumni of the University of Hull
English molecular biologists
Yale School of Medicine faculty
Howard Hughes Medical Investigators
Fellows of the Royal Society
Members of the United States National Academy of Sciences
Yale Sterling Professors
People from Chelmsford
National Institute for Medical Research faculty
Members of the National Academy of Medicine